Bush Hockey League (formerly Old Time Hockey) is an ice hockey video game for Windows and PlayStation 4. A version for Xbox One was released on 29 November 2017. A version for the Nintendo Switch was released on 14 April 2022. The game is developed and published by V7 Entertainment.

The game draws inspiration from the 1977 film Slap Shot, and makes multiple references to the film's characters and teams.

Gameplay
The game's setting is the 1970s in the fictional Bush Hockey League (BHL). Executive producer Mike Torillo stated that the game takes inspiration from the 1977 film Slap Shot. Bush Hockey League has an exhibition mode, and a story mode. It features a variety of control schemes, including simplified two-button controls, and a "beer mode" which only requires one hand to control. The game contains 10 playable teams. Game commentary is provided by Matt Baker.

Reception

Critical reception was mixed, with the game getting 56/100 on Metacritic. Some reviewers panned the game, citing laggy gameplay, crashes, and glitches, and detracting from the overall experience. At least two reviews praised the game for its style, and its ability to bring the spirit of the era to life.

References

External links
Bush Hockey League at Steam

Video games set in the 1970s
Xbox One games
PlayStation 4 games
Windows games
Nintendo Switch games
2017 video games
Ice hockey video games
Multiplayer and single-player video games
Video games developed in Canada
Video games set in Canada
Video games set in the United States